John William Abercrombie (May 17, 1866 – July 2, 1940) was President of the University of Alabama and a member of the United States House of Representatives from Alabama.

Biography
Abercrombie was born in St. Clair County, Alabama, near Kellys Creek Post Office, in 1866. He was the son of Henry M. and Sarah A. (Kendrick) Abercrombie. He attended rural schools, and ultimately graduated from Oxford College (Alabama) in Alabama in 1866. He went on to receive a degree in law from the University of Alabama in 1888. He was admitted to the bar that same year. On January 8, 1891, he married Rose Merrill.

Career
Abercrombie practiced in Cleburne County, Alabama through 1890. He also served as a high school principal, city school superintendent, and college president from 1888 through 1898.

Elected to the Alabama Senate, Abercrombie served from 1896 through 1898. He then served the state as the state superintendent of education from 1898 to 1902. In 1902 he was made the President of the University of Alabama and he served in that capacity until 1911.

In 1912, Abercrombie was elected from the Democratic Party to the United States House of Representatives, where he served from March 4, 1913, to March 3, 1917.   He went on to serve as Solicitor of Labor and Acting Secretary in the United States Department of Labor from 1918 through 1920.  In 1920, he was elected the Superintendent of Education in Alabama.

Death
Abercrombie resided in Montgomery, Alabama, where he died on  July 2, 1940 (age 74 years, 46 days). He is interred at Greenwood Cemetery, Montgomery, Alabama. He was a Freemason and a member of Scottish Rite, as well as the Kappa Alpha Order (collegiate social fraternity); Phi Beta Kappa (collegiate honor society); Knights of Pythias; Woodmen; and Kiwanis.

References

External links

1866 births
1940 deaths
Democratic Party Alabama state senators
People from Cleburne County, Alabama
Politicians from Montgomery, Alabama
People from St. Clair County, Alabama
Presidents of the University of Alabama
University of Alabama School of Law alumni
Democratic Party members of the United States House of Representatives from Alabama
Lawyers from Montgomery, Alabama